Nawabpur Road is a road in Old Dhaka City, Bangladesh, and is associated with the Shankhari and Gulistan bazaars. It is a busy road often jammed with rickshaws, human drawn carts, and foot traffic.

History
Nawabpur was known as Umraha Para. During the Mughal era, diplomats used to reside here, which is how it got its name. Umraha Para was later renamed Nawabpur.

In 1840, it was one of the two main thoroughfares of Dhaka, running north from Sadarghat to Thatari Bazar.

On 22 February 1952, during a Bengali language rally, police fired on marchers killing several including Sofiur Rahman and a nine-year-old boy.

Amenities
The largest known market for spare parts in Bangladesh is situated in Nawabpur.
There are numerous businesses, including low-cost hotels.
Victoria Park, a very ancient and historical site under the name of Andaghar Maidan, is situated at the end of Nawabpur Road.

It specially was a Hindu based area, which is shown by the two  Hindu temples, named Radha Shyam Mandir and Laxmi Narayan Mandir, that are situated on the road.

Photographs

See also
 Shankharibazar massacre
 1964 East-Pakistan riots

References

Citations
 

Old Dhaka
Streets in Dhaka